Tecumseh is a 1972 East German western film directed by Hans Kratzert and starring Gojko Mitić, Annekathrin Bürger and Rolf Römer. The film depicts the life of the Native American leader Tecumseh (1768–1813), including his role in Tecumseh's War and his later death in the War of 1812 while fighting with the British against the United States.

The film is a red western made by DEFA, the state-owned East German studio. It is part of a popular string of films starring the Yugoslav actor Gojko Mitić which, in line with the policies of Communist East Germany, attempted to present a more critical, but also more realistic, view of American expansion to the West than was characterized by Hollywood. The film, along with others, was also made partly in response to the successful series of Karl May films made in West Germany.

Partial cast

References

Bibliography

External links 
 

1972 films
East German films
German Western (genre) films
German historical films
Film
1972 Western (genre) films
1970s historical films
1970s German-language films
Films directed by Hans Kratzert
Films set in the 1810s
Films set in Indiana
War of 1812 films
Ostern films
1970s German films